Local elections were held in Moldova on 20 October 2019, with a runoff for mayors held two weeks later.

Legal context
According to Article 119 of the "Electoral Code" of Moldova, local elected representatives are elected "for a four year term, which begins from the date of conducting local general elections". The previous local election was held in 2015.

Results

The district and municipal councils, after administrative-territorial unit

References

External links
 Electoral Code of Moldova 
 Election Code of Moldova

Local elections
Local elections in Moldova
Local elections
Moldovan local elections